James Beveridge (February 8, 1868 – December 27, 1932) was an American college football player and coach. Beveridge was raised in Schenectady, New York and played football at Princeton University in 1892, before graduating in 1893. He was the head football coach of Western Reserve University, now Case Western Reserve University, during the 1893 college football season, earning a 5–3–1 record. Beveridge graduated from New York Law School in 1895.

Beveridge married Anna Preston Lamb in 1900. He died on December 27, 1932, at Jamaica Hospital in Queens, New York, a week after having an operation for appendicitis. Beveridge is buried with his wife, Anna, at Evergreen Cemetery in New Haven, Connecticut.

Head coaching record

References

1868 births
1932 deaths
19th-century players of American football
Case Western Spartans football coaches
Williams Ephs football players
New York Law School alumni